Canyon Collective Factory Team is a professional Mountain biking team which competes in UCI sanctioned events as well as the Enduro World Series.
The team consists of former men's Junior Downhill World Champion and elite silver medalist Troy Brosnan; Canadian Mark Wallace (cyclist), and Current Junior World Champion Kye A'Hern, racing as Elites with Jacob Jewitt racing in the Junior category and ex Intense Factory Racing downhiller Jack Moir representing the team at the Enduro World Series.

References 

Cycling teams based in Germany
Mountain biking teams and clubs